Brian Louis O'Neal (born February 25, 1970) is a former American football fullback in the National Football League for the Philadelphia Eagles, and the San Francisco 49ers. He played college football at Penn State University.

References

1970 births
Living people
Players of American football from Cincinnati
American football fullbacks
Penn State Nittany Lions football players
Philadelphia Eagles players
San Francisco 49ers players